This is a partial and incomplete list of California wildfires.  California has dry, windy, and often hot weather conditions from spring through late autumn that can produce moderate to severe wildfires. Pre-1800, when the area was much more forested and the ecology much more resilient, 4.4 million acres (1.8 million hectares) of forest and shrubland burned annually. California land area totals 99,813,760 or roughly 100 million acres, so since 2000, the area that burned annually has ranged between 90,000 acres, or 0.09%, and 1,590,000 acres, or 1.59% of the total land of California. During the 2020 wildfire season alone, over 8,100 fires contributed to the burning of nearly 4.5 million acres of land.

Wildfires in California are growing more dangerous because of the accumulation of wood fuel in forests, higher population and greater electricity transmission and distribution lines. United States taxpayers pay about US$3 billion a year to fight wildfires, and big fires can lead to billions of dollars in property losses. At times, these wildfires are fanned or made worse by strong, dry winds, known as Diablo winds when they occur in the northern part of the state and Santa Ana winds when they occur in the south. However, from a historical perspective, it has been estimated that prior to 1850, about 4.5 million acres (17,000 km²) burned yearly, in fires that lasted for months, with wildfire activity peaking roughly every 30 years, when up to 11.8 million acres (47,753 km³) of land burned. The much larger wildfire seasons in the past can be attributed to the policy of Native Californians regularly setting controlled burns and allowing natural fires to run their course, which prevented devastating wildfires from overrunning the state.

More than 350,000 people in California live in towns sited completely within zones deemed to be at very high risk of fire. In total, more than 2.7 million people live in "very high fire hazard severity zones", which also include areas at lesser risk.

The four most common ignition sources of large California wildfires since 1980 have been equipment generating sparks (chainsaws, grinders, mowers, etc.), overhead power lines, arsonists, and lightning.

Statistics

Area burned per year

Starting in 2001, the National Interagency Fire Center began keeping more accurate records on the total fire acreage burned in each state.

A 2015 study addressed whether the increase in fire risk in California is attributable to climate change.

Largest wildfires 
The 20 largest wildfires according to the California Department of Forestry and Fire Protection.

Deadliest wildfires 
The 20 deadliest wildfires according to the California Department of Forestry and Fire Protection.

Most destructive wildfires 
The 20 most destructive wildfires according to the California Department of Forestry and Fire Protection.

Areas of repeated ignition

In some parts of California, fires can recur in areas with histories of fires. In Oakland, for example, fires of various size and ignition occurred in 1923, 1931, 1933, 1937, 1946, 1955, 1960, 1961, 1968, 1970, 1980, 1990, 1991, 1995, 2002, and 2008. Orange County, Riverside County, San Bernardino County, and Los Angeles County are other examples. Orange and San Bernardino counties share a border that runs north to south through the Chino Hills State Park, with the park's landscape ranging from large green coastal sage scrub, grassland, and woodland, to areas of brown sparsely dense vegetation made drier by droughts or hot summers. The valley's grass and barren land can become easily susceptible to dry spells and drought, therefore making it a prime spot for brush fires and conflagrations, many of which have occurred since 1914. Hills and canyons have seen brush or wildfires in 1914, the 1920s, 1930s, 1940s, 1950s, 1960s, 1970s, 1980s, 1990s, 2000s, and into today.

On occasion, lightning strikes from thunderstorms may also spark wildfires in areas that have seen past ignition. Examples of this are the 1999 Megram Fire, the 2008 California wildfires., as well as both the LNU and SCU Lightning Complex fires of 2020.

See also
 List of wildfires
 2012–13 North American drought
 Wildfires in the United States
 Climate change in California

References

External links

 Official California Department of Forestry and Fire Protection (CAL FIRE) site 

 
Wildfires
Wildfire
Lists of wildfires in the United States